is a Japanese swimmer, from Abashiri. He competed in the 4 × 200 metre freestyle relay event at the 2012 Summer Olympics.

References

1991 births
Living people
Olympic swimmers of Japan
Swimmers at the 2012 Summer Olympics
Japanese male freestyle swimmers
Universiade medalists in swimming
Universiade silver medalists for Japan
Medalists at the 2011 Summer Universiade

People from Hokkaido
21st-century Japanese people